Idy Chan Yuk Lin (born 25 March 1960) is a popular Hong Kong TV actress, especially during the 1980s and was named as one of the Five Beauties of TVB.

Career
She joined showbiz in 1977. She is most famous for her portrayal of three of the characters from the three dramas of Jin Yong are her heavenly role of Xiaolongnü along with Andy Lau as Yang Guo in the 1983 TVB adaptation of Louis Cha's Wuxia novel The Return of the Condor Heroes,Wang Yuyan on The Demi-Gods and Semi-Devils (1982), and as the innocent Xiaozhao with Adam Cheng as Zhang Wuji on The Heaven Sword and Dragon Saber (1978).

In 1982, she also portrayed Wang Yuyan in television and film adaptations of Demi-Gods and Semi-Devils. Idy was more popular in her small screen work, however she was in many good films from the early 1980s to the early 1990s like Casino Raiders.

Off-screen, the long 5-year (1978–1983) romance between Idy and Chow Yun-fat also made headlines in the early days of their TV careers. The shooting of the TVB series The Return of the Condor Heroes resulted in Andy Lau's unrequited love with her. Idy also settled in New York, U.S. during her short marriage with business man Peter Chan Siu-Moo.

In 1988, She played Huang Rong in Taiwan CTV's The Legend of the Condor Heroes (1988) Not popular in Asia

Idy Chan has become less active in the showbiz since 1993. In 2007, she returned to shoot the TVB series Catch Me Now, which also marked her comeback to the showbiz.  Ever since, she occasionally appears on TV shows in Mainland China and Hong Kong. Besides running her own and family businesses in advertising and restaurant, she's also an active volunteer of many charities.

Lottery streak
Within Hong Kong culture she is known to have won the lottery multiple times.  One of the most publicized response was in the 2007 episode of Be My Guest. She was interviewed by Stephen Chan Chi Wan, who asked whether winning the Canadian lottery of 17 million and Hong Kong lottery of 30 million dollars was true.  She deflected the question hoping to answer it in private.

Filmography

Television Series

Films
The Way We Are 天水圍的日輿夜 (2008) - Cameo
A Warrior's Tragedy 邊城浪子 (1993)  	
The Monks From Shaolin 智勇和尚(1992) 	
Sisters of the World Unite 莎莎嘉嘉站起來 (1991)
Blood Stained Tradewind 血在風上(1990)	
Whampoa Blues 壯志豪情(1990)
Kawashima Yoshiko 川島芳子 (1990)	
Stage Door Johnny 舞台姊妹(1990)
L'Air du Temps 時代之風(1990)
Casino Raiders 至尊無上 (1989)
Maybe Next Time 緣份游戲 (1989)
Rule of The Game 遊戲規則 (1989)
The Crazy Companies 最佳損友(1988) 	
Edge Of Darkness 陷阱邊沿 (1988)	 	
I Am Sorry 說謊的女人(1988) 	
On The Run 亡命鴛鴦(1988) 	
The Siamese Twins 連體(1984)  	
Demi-Gods and Semi-Devils 天龍八部  (1984) 		 	
Last Night's Light 昨夜之燈 (1983)
The Sweet and Sour Cops Part II 摩登雜差 (1982)
Shaolin and Wu Tang 少林與武當(1981) 	
The Extras 茄哩啡 (1978)

References

External links

Idy Chan - Hong Kong Movie DataBase
Chan Yuk Lin Online 陳玉蓮在線

1960 births
Hong Kong Buddhists
Hong Kong film actresses
Hong Kong television actresses
Living people
TVB actors
20th-century Hong Kong actresses
21st-century Hong Kong actresses